Dennis William Mahon (born August 29, 1950) is an American right-wing terrorist who is part of the radical white supremacist movement. He was indicted for the 2004 Office of Diversity and Dialogue mail bombing in Scottsdale, Arizona. Mahon is currently incarcerated at FCI Terre Haute.

Early life
On August 29, 1950, Dennis Mahon was born with his identical twin brother, Daniel Wallace Mahon, to Bill and Barbara Mahon in Davis Junction, Illinois.

Dennis attended Auburn High School and graduated from Stillman Valley High School in 1968. He later received a degree in aviation management from Rock Valley College in 1970. He also served in the army during Vietnam War era.

White supremacist activities
The Mahon twins first got involved in white supremacist activism in the 1970s when they joined the Knights of the Ku Klux Klan. Mahon claimed that he was first inspired to join after reading The Turner Diaries while working as an aircraft mechanic in Florida. In 1988 they left the group to form the Missouri White Knights of the Ku Klux Klan in the Kansas City area. In 1989 Mahon unsuccessfully ran for alderman in Northmoor, Missouri on a platform of keeping the community white. In the early 1990s, Mahon moved to Tulsa, Oklahoma and left the Klan to become affiliated with Tom Metzger's White Aryan Resistance. Mahon felt that the Klan had gotten too moderate and was that Klan's membership was full of informants and low quality recruits.

In 1991, Mahon held a rally in Tulsa in support of then Iraqi president Saddam Hussein and to protest the Persian Gulf War. Mahon later claimed to have received money from the Iraqi government. Also in 1991, Mahon travelled to several cities in Germany to recruit for the Klan. Mahon lead 60 people in a cross burning in an area southeast of Berlin. Mahon also claimed he encouraged German recruits to commit firebombings of buildings occupied by foreigners and that he trained them in guerilla warfare.

In 1993, Mahon travelled to Canada on behalf of Metzger but was deported back to America shortly after arriving as Canadian authorities claimed he was threat.

Alleged ties to the Oklahoma City bombing
Starting in 1992, Mahon is known to have been a frequent visitor to the white separatist community Elohim City. According to Mahon himself, he stated that he resided there for approximately four years and kept an Airstream trailer parked there, before leaving in August 1995. During this time, he also began taking his then-girlfriend, Carol Howe, to the compound. 
 
While working as an informant for the ATF, Carol Howe reported that Mahon, along with Andreas Strassmeir, discussed "targeting federal installations for destruction," such as the Tulsa IRS Office, the Tulsa Federal Building, and the Oklahoma City Federal Building.

Mahon was called to appear before a grand jury in Tulsa, Oklahoma in July 1997 and was to answer questions in relation to the bombing. Mahon did appear but did not answer any of the questions he was asked about the bombing. One witness claimed to have seen Mahon sitting next to Timothy McVeigh in the Ryder truck that contained the bomb used in the attack around 30 minutes before the explosion. However, phone records and other witnesses later showed that Mahon was in Illinois on the day of the bombing.

In a 2001 interview with Jon Ronson, Mahon acknowledged meeting McVeigh at a Tulsa gunshow and praised his actions, but denied involvement in the bombing. He did however accuse Strassmeir of being involved in the bombing.

In a 2007 interview with a National Geographic reporter, Mahon praised McVeigh for his actions.

2004 Scottsdale Office of Diversity mail bombing

The bombing
On February 26, 2004, Scottsdale's Office of Diversity and Dialogue received a package in a cardboard box addressed to Don Logan, the office's director. The package contained a bomb which exploded in Logan's hands, seriously injuring him and his assistant. Another office worker received less severe injuries. The Mahon brothers quickly became suspects as they had attended a white power rock festival a few weeks prior to the gathering and Mahon had called the office and left a threatening voice mail a few months prior to bombing.

Investigation
While investigating Dennis and Daniel Mahon for involvement in the mail bombing, the Bureau of Alcohol, Tobacco, Firearms and Explosives recruited ex-stripper Rebecca "Becca" Williams as an investigative informant. Williams moved into the same trailer park as the Mahon twins and struck a friendship with them. She worked over time to win their trust. Williams was nicknamed the "Trailer Park Mata Hari". Mahon was recorded bragging to Williams that he had committed the bombing of the Scottsdale office and several other bombings of an abortion clinic, a Jewish community center, and offices of the IRS and immigration authorities.

After a five-year undercover federal investigation, the Mahon brothers were arrested at their Illinois home in 2009 for the connection to the 2004 Office of Diversity and Dialogue mail bombing. After the Mahons were arrested, the homes of Metzger and a Powell, Missouri affiliate named Robert Joos were raided.

Trial and Conviction
The jury found Dennis Mahon guilty for the bombing, but found his brother, Daniel Mahon, not guilty.

References

1950 births
Living people
Oklahoma City bombing
American male criminals
American neo-Nazis
Bombers (people)
White separatists
Terrorist incidents in the United States by perpetrator
Criminals from Illinois
People from Tulsa, Oklahoma
American Ku Klux Klan members
Prisoners and detainees of the United States federal government
Improvised explosive device bombings in the United States
United States Army soldiers